Teșna may refer to the following places in Romania:

Teșna, a village in Coșna Commune, Suceava County
Teșna, a village in Poiana Stampei Commune, Suceava County
Teșna (river), a tributary of the Coșna in Suceava County